Landgrave Charles August Ludwig Philip of Hesse-Philippsthal-Barchfeld (27 June 1784 in Barchfeld – 17 July 1854 in Philippsthal) was a member of the House of Hesse and was the ruling Landgrave of Hesse-Philippsthal-Barchfeld from 1803 to 1806 and from 1813 until his death.

Life 
Charles was a son of the Landgrave Adolph of Hesse-Philippsthal-Barchfeld (1743-1803) from his marriage to Princess Louise of Saxe-Meiningen (1752-1805 ), the daughter of the Duke Anton Ulrich of Saxe-Meiningen.  In 1803, he succeeded his father as Landgrave of Hesse-Philippsthal-Barchfeld.

In 1806, Hesse-Philippsthal-Barchfeld was annexed by the Kingdom of Westphalia.  After Napoleon had been defeated in the Battle of Leipzig, Charles was restored as Landgrave of Hesse-Philippsthal-Barchfeld under the supremacy of the Electorate of Hesse.

Charles served in the Prussian and later joined the Russian army.  He fought on the Russian side in the Napoleonic wars, in particular in the Battle of Borodino.  After he retired from the Russian military service, he joined the Hessain army, where he was promoted to lieutenant general in 1836.

He later lived at Augustenau Castle in Herleshausen.

Marriage and issue 
Charles first married on 19 Jul 1816, in Öhringen, to Auguste of Hohenlohe-Ingelfingen (1793-1821), the daughter of Prince Frederick Louis, Prince of Hohenlohe-Ingelfingen, with whom he had the following children:
 Bertha (1818-1888), married in 1839 Prince Louis of Bentheim and Steinfurt (1812-1890)
 Emily (1821-1836)

He married his second wife on 10 September 1823 in Steinfurt.  She was Princess Sophie of Bentheim-Steinfurt (1794-1873), the daughter of Prince Louis William Geldricus Ernest of Bentheim and Steinfurt, with whom he had the following children:
 Victor (1824-1846)
 Alexander (1826-1841)
 Alexis (1829-1905), Landgrave of Hesse-Philippsthal-Barchfeld
 married in 1854 to Princess Louise of Prussia (1829-1901), divorced in 1861
 William (1831-1890), married:
 in 1857 morganatically to Princess Maria of Hanau-Hořowitz (1839-1917), divorced in 1872
 in 1873 to Princess Juliane of Bentheim and Steinfurt (1842-1878), had issue including Chlodwig, Landgrave of Hesse-Philippsthal-Barchfeld
 in 1879 to Princess Adelheid of Bentheim and Steinfurt (1840-1880)
 in 1884 to Princess Augusta of Schleswig-Holstein-Sonderburg-Glücksburg (1844-1932), they were the parents of Prince Christian of Hesse-Philippsthal-Barchfeld

Ancestors

References 
 Johann Samuel Ersch (ed.): Allgemeine Encyclopädie der Wissenschaften und Künste in alphabetischer ..., p. 297

Landgraves of Hesse
House of Hesse
1784 births
1854 deaths
19th-century German people